George Hume may refer to:
 George Hume (politician) (1866–1946), British politician and leader of the London County Council
 George H. Hume, American heir, businessman and philanthropist
 George Sherwood Hume (1893–1965), Canadian geologist
 George Hume (cricketer) (1800–1872), English cricketer
 George Steuart Hume (1747–1788), Maryland physician and landowner
 Sir George Hume, 1st Baronet, Scottish-Irish baronet

See also
 George Home (disambiguation)